The IKCO Samand Soren is a large family car manufactured by Iran Khodro (IKCO). It is a facelift version of the IKCO Samand, first released in early 2007. It comes with a driver airbag, pretensioner seat-belts, headlight height adjuster, and active antenna. It is named after Surena, an ancient Parthian spahbed (general).

Soren ELX
The Samand Soren ELX is a modified version of the Samand Soren, released in 2008. It has a number of new safety options including ESP (as an option) and a front passenger airbag. It also has a new interior design, including a new dashboard and instrument cluster. Its electrical systems are fully digitized.

There are three available engines for the Samand Soren ELX:

EF7
EF7TC
Peugeot TU5JP4

References

Cars of Iran
Front-wheel-drive vehicles
Sedans
Mid-size cars
Soren
Cars introduced in 2007